Volha Berazniova (born 10 May 1980 in Minsk, Belarus) is a Belarusian rower. She competed in the women's eight at the 2000 Summer Olympics and the women's quadruple sculls at the 2004 Summer Olympics.

References

Living people
Belarusian female rowers
Olympic rowers of Belarus
Rowers at the 2000 Summer Olympics
Rowers at the 2004 Summer Olympics
Sportspeople from Minsk
1980 births
European Rowing Championships medalists